The 2015 Morelos Open was a professional tennis tournament played on outdoor hard courts. It was the second edition  was part of the 2015 ATP Challenger Tour, offering prize money of $75,000 on 16–22 February 2015.

ATP singles main draw entrants

Seeds

Other entrants 
The following players received wildcards into the singles main draw:
  Daniel Garza
  Tigre Hank
  Fabian Lara
  Luis Patiño

The following players gained entry into the singles main draw as an alternate:
  Giovanni Lapentti

The following players used special exempt to gain entry into the singles main draw:
  Damir Džumhur

The following players received entry from the qualifying draw:
  Bastian Trinker
  Connor Smith
  Henrique Cunha
  Dimitar Kutrovsky

Champions

Singles 

  Víctor Estrella Burgos def.  Damir Džumhur, 7–5, 6–4

Doubles 

  Ruben Gonzales /  Darren Walsh def.  Emilio Gómez /  Roberto Maytín, 4–6, 6–3, [12–10]

External links 
 Results
 Singles results

2015
Morelos Open
Hard court tennis tournaments
Mex